Man Overboard (German: Mann über Bord) is a 1921 German silent drama film directed by Karl Grune and starring Grit Hegesa, Erich Kaiser-Titz and Alfred Abel. It premiered in Berlin on 19 May 1921.

Cast
 Alfred Abel   
 Grit Hegesa   
 Erich Kaiser-Titz   
 Guido Herzfeld   
 Ernst Hofmann   
 Loni Nest as Das Kind 
 Magda Madeleine   
 Vilma von Mayburg   
 Max Wogritsch

References

Bibliography
 Grange, William. Cultural Chronicle of the Weimar Republic. Scarecrow Press, 2008.

External links

1921 films
Films of the Weimar Republic
German silent feature films
German drama films
Films directed by Karl Grune
1921 drama films
German black-and-white films
UFA GmbH films
Silent drama films
1920s German films